Cyril J J Berry (1918 – 4 November 2002) was a writer known for his book First Steps in Winemaking, which has sold more than three million copies worldwide.

Throughout the first half of the 20th century, homebrewing in Britain was limited by taxation, prohibition, and scarcity of ingredients during wartime. One of the earliest modern attempts to regulate private production was the Inland Revenue Act of 1880 in the United Kingdom; this required a 5-shilling homebrewing licence. In the UK, in April 1963, the UK Chancellor of the Exchequer, Reggie Maudling removed the need for the 1880 brewing licence.

Following the end of sugar rationing in 1953 after the Second World War, and the repeal of the brewing licence, interest in brewing at home started to thrive. Berry was instrumental in this phenomenon as one of the founders of the first British amateur winemakers' circle in Andover, Hampshire and three other English counties in the 1950s. The movement grew quickly from these beginnings. By 1960 there were 86 known wine circles in the UK and over 100 by 1961. A 1962 estimate of membership put numbers at 30,000 in the UK alone. There are now hundreds of wine circles throughout the country and even virtual wine circles with online chat sessions and organised tastings. Berry was one of the founders of the National Association of Winemakers (UK) and served as its first chairman from 1960 to 1967. In 1963 he was instrumental in establishing the Winemaking National Guild of Judges (now National Guild of Wine and Beer Judges) and was one of its early chairmen.

Berry also produced the Amateur Winemaker magazine and published First Steps in Winemaking, 130 New Winemaking recipes, and Home Brewed Beers and Stouts. First Steps in Winemaking is notable as a resource for winemaking technique and recipe, and is still in print following its original publication in 1960. It includes methods for traditional grape wines, as well as "country wines" using seasonal fruit and vegetables, tinned and dried ingredients, and commercial juices. It is the source for the simplest common method for measuring alcohol by volume in wine:

Prior to his retirement in 1967, Berry worked as a newspaper editor, most notably for the Andover Advertiser. Berry served as mayor of Andover in 1972–73. He was an alumnus of the Andover Grammar School and published Old Andover, a collection of local photos and records dating from 1840 to 1960.

Berry died in Nerja, Spain, in 2002.

Publications
First Steps in Winemaking, 

130 New Winemaking Recipes, 

Home-Brewed Beers and Stouts,

References

External links
 Former Editor Dies, Southern Daily Echo

British writers
British newspaper editors
1918 births
2002 deaths
People from Andover, Hampshire
British winemakers